The battle of Maraycalla was fought in 1534 between Spanish conquistadors and renegade forces of the Inca Empire (Atahualpa faction of the Inca Civil War), whose capital Cuzco had been taken by the Spaniards in November 1533. The Inca army was commanded by famous general Quizquiz. After losing the battle, Quizquiz' army retreated via Cajamarca to its base in the Northern capital Quito.

When approaching Quito after marching more than 1500 km, Quizquiz learned that Spanish forces had already taken possession of Quito. Quizquiz wanted to continue the fight, but the Inca general was slain by his mutinous forces.

Maraycalla
Cuzco
Maraycalla
Cuzco
Maraycalla
1534 in the Spanish Empire
16th century in Peru
1534 in the Inca civilization